Robert Ernest Bryson (30 March 1867 – 16 April 1942) was a Scottish composer and organist who spent most of his life in Birkenhead, England, working as a cotton merchant in Liverpool.  He was the founder-chairman and later President of the Rodewald Concert Society in Liverpool.

Family background

Robert Ernest Bryson (known as a composer more often as just Ernest Bryson), was born in Milton, Glasgow, Scotland on 30 March 1867 and died 16 April 1942 in St Briavels, Gloucestershire. He was the only son of Robert Bryson (1831–1886), a cotton merchant, and Margaret Bryson (née Young, 1839–1936), but was brought to Tranmere, Birkenhead (then part of Cheshire, England) at an early age.  He appears to have lived much of his life at what became the family home, 1 Chetwynd Road, Oxton, Cheshire (now part of Birkenhead, Wirral), where he remained with his three sisters, Jessie Frew Bryson (1862–1954), Sarah Ferguson Bryson (1864–1932) and Margaret Edith Bryson (Medical Missionary, 1865–1950) after their fathers’ death.  He purchased Yew Tree Cottage at St Briavels, Gloucestershire, in 1907 as a country residence and was registered there as a voter from 1910, but does not appear to have lived there until he retired in 1942. He, and his three sisters all died there unmarried, along with their widowed mother.

Early years
Bryson was educated at Birkenhead School (1877–81) where he is thought that he obtained much of his musical education, although this may have been extra curricula as the school records show that he was only studying Greek, Latin and French in his final year. No record has been found indicating that he went on to any sort of higher education, but it was another three years before he commenced his apprenticeship.

Professional career
Bryson joined his father's firm of Bryson, Cooper & Co, cotton brokers, of Liverpool as an apprentice at the age of 17.  He became a partner on his father's death.

Musical career
Very little information about Ernest Bryson's musical life is currently available. He has not been included in Grove's dictionary of music since 1954. Eaglefield-Hull (Source 2) is only available in specialist libraries. Scottish Composers (Source 4) only mentions his opera and symphonies.  Most of the information we have comes from obituaries which are not always reliable.

Bryson appears to have studied music with William H. Hunt, a local music teacher, along with Hunt's nephews, Frederic and Ernest Austin who both became composers, much neglected after their death.  He was organist of Christ Church, Birkenhead and St Saviour Church, Oxton and spent most of his spare time in composition.

His earliest known composition was Allegro Moderato in D minor for organ, which was published by Reeves in 1889.  His first big success was probably his Symphony No 1 which was performed in Liverpool by the Liverpool Orchestral Society under Bantock in 1908 and published by Breitkopf & Härtel, It has more recently been reviewed by Jürgen Schaarwächter. Unfortunately, like other English Symphonies at that time, it was rather over-shadowed by Elgar's Symphony No 1.  There were further performances in Bournemouth under James Lyon (1872–1949) in February 1912. and in Manchester by the Hallé Orchestra Unfortunately his Symphony No 2 appears to be lost, although it was performed in Manchester on 1 January 1928 by the Hallé Orchestra under Sir Hamilton Harty and broadcast. It was also awarded a prize by the Carnegie Music Trust.  Both Symphonies were reviewed in detail by Leigh Henry.

As part of the Musical League Festival, Bryson's Idylls of a Summer's Day was performed in 1909. His next big success was Voices, a study for orchestra premièred by Sir Henry Wood at the Promenade Concert, London on 15 September 1910. Next came The Stranger for Baritone, chorus & small orchestra, which was premièred by the Liverpool Philharmonic Choir and Orchestra in 1917. His part-song Drum-taps was reviewed as a new publication in 1918. His Fanfare for an Adventure was published in 1921 as a piano version but the original version has not been found, nor has the occasion for which it was written been identified.  It may have been a national event or a local, perhaps Boy Scout, event.

The peak of Bryson's composing career was probably his opera The Leper's Flute with libretto by Ian Colvin. It was premièred in Glasgow on 15 October 1926 by the British National Opera Company and subsequently toured to Edinburgh, Manchester, Liverpool and London. Also that year Bryson's song cycle The Unfading Garden was introduced by Hugh Campbell at the Grotriau Hall. A song cycle, A Last Harvest was played at the Reid Concert at the University of Edinburgh on 19 November 1927. The Radio Times shows that on 27 August 1937 Bryson's The Field of Boliauns was broadcast; performed by the BBC Orchestra conducted by Clarence Raybould with Parry Jones (tenor), but no other record of this work has been found.

Bryson claimed that he had been the confident of William J Ridley in the design of the organ at Liverpool Cathedral. Ridley was an amateur organist and an enthusiastic member of the organ committee, who was determined that the organ at Liverpool Cathedral would be the biggest and best organ in the World.  He probably drew up the original concept but the detailed specification would most likely have been drawn up by F H Burstall (1851–1916), the incumbent organist of the already-constructed Lady Chapel in consultation with the organ builder Henry Willis II.  Following Burstall's death Henry Goss-Custard, became the incumbent organist, and took Burstall's place on the Committee.  Rising costs after the war required some modifications of the design for which Goss-Custard would have been responsible. However, Ridley was still credited with the inception of the project. Ridley may have had maintained some influence on the design throughout as he held the trump card – he had a rich aunt who was prepared to donate the money needed.  Sadley he died before the organ was completed.

Ridley left a legacy to Bryson which he used to found an organ fund to replace the little antiquated organ at St Briavels, Gloucestershire, where he was organist in his retirement. He is commemorated by a plaque on the organ.  The claim that the Liverpool Cathedral organ was modelled on the organ at St Briavels is clearly incorrect as the Cathedral organ was designed first.  The suggestion that the design of the St Briavels organ was based on the specification for the Cathedral is also unlikely because of the vastly different scale of the two organs and their locations.  However, an expert on organ design might find some similarities in specifications of the two instruments.

It was after his retirement to St. Briavels in 1924 that Bryson was invited to become the President of the Rodewald Concert Society.  He accepted only after Elgar had declined the honour.

Attempts to find Bryson's manuscripts have so far failed.  His sister, Jessie Bryson (1862–1954), is known to have been collecting them together after his death, so it seems likely that she deposited them somewhere for safe custody.

Compositions

Operas

Opera The Leper's Flute (Goodwin & Tab, 1925)

Orchestral

Fantasia-Overture (1894)
Idylls of a Summer's Day (1909)
Voices, a study for orchestra (1910)
Symphony No 1 in D (Breitkopf & Härtel, 1909)
Symphony No 2 in C (1928)
Vaila, fantasy for string orchestra (Breitkopf & Härtel, 1909)

Cantatas and Oratorios

The Stranger for Baritone, chorus & small orchestra (Stainer & Bell, 1917)
The Field of Boliauns for tenor and orchestra (1937)

Songs

A Last Harvest, a song cycle for voice and orchestra
Nae sae bad as it micht hae been for one or two baritones (Larway, 1927)
So, the Year's done with (Oxford University Press, 1927)
A song of long ago (Weekes & Co, 1890)
The Unfading Garden (1926)
What the People Tell Old Büsen (Stainer & Bell, 1911)

Part Songs

Drum-taps, seven part songs for chorus with side-drum (J Curwen & Sons, 1918)
Grey, Canzonetta for female voices (Stainer & Bell, 1914)
Simple as a Daisy for male voices (Curwen, 1930)
Six Silly Songs for sensible children, (with Ernest Austin), (J. H. Larway, 1916)
The Angler (J Curwen & Sons, 1925)
The Silent Town for female voices (1914)

Church music

The Unison Chant Choir-Book, a collection of original chants designed to encourage congregational singing (with A. W. Pollitt, Henry Frowde 1909)
Most Glorious Lord of Life, Anthem (London 1912)

Chamber music

String Quartet No 1
String Quartet No 2
Adagio cantabile, trio for violin, pianoforte and harmonium or American organ (1895?) (Donajowski, 1916)

Organ

Allegro Deciso in D (1895)
Allegro Grazioso (Schott, 1922)
Allegro Moderato in D min (Reeves) 1889)
Fantasia-Overture in D (Donajowski, 1894)
Introduction & Symphonic Finale (Larway, 1910)
Invocation (Mayhew)
Pæan (J. Williams}, 1940)
Prelude & Fugue in D (Donajowski, 1893)
Processional Fantasia in C (Donajowski, 1893)
P†n for organ [sic] (1940)
Rhapsody (J. Williams}, 1935)
Sequence of 7 Miniatures (Schott, 1922)
Six Church Preludes (Novello, 1892)
Six Pieces Op. 26 (Donajowski, 1895)
Sonata in C min (Forsyth)
Two Miniatures (Schott & Co. 1922)

Piano

Through the Little Meadows Dedicated to and first performed by Frederick Brandon
Fanfare for an Adventure arr. for piano (1921),
Remembrance, A melody for pianoforte (J. H. Larway), 1926)

Sources

Bryson, (Robert) Ernest, Grove Dictionary of Music and Musicians, 1954 and earlier editions
A Dictionary of Modern Music and Musicians, Ed. Eaglefield-Hull, Dent 1924.
 Bryson, Ernest British Library catalogues
 Ernest Bryson Scottish Composers
 Organ Biography (Requires a subscription for composer details)
 Bryson, Ernest IMSLP
Rodewald Concert Society archives

References

External links 
  British Library catalogue
  Organ Biography Biographicalical Dictionary of Organists, Composers for Organ and Organ Builders
 IMSLP Petrucci Music Library

1867 births
1942 deaths
Scottish composers
Scottish organists
British male organists
People educated at Birkenhead School
Musicians from Glasgow
People from Birkenhead
People from St Briavels